Robert Jarratt Crosthwaite (13 October 1837, Wellington, Somerset9 September 1925, Bolton Percy) was the inaugural Bishop of Beverley in the late nineteenth and early twentieth centuries.

Born in Wellington, Somerset, on 13 October 1837, Robert Crosthwaite was the son of Benjamin Crosthwaite, priest and canon. He was educated at Leeds Grammar School and Trinity College, Cambridge. Ordained in 1862, he began his career with a curacy at North Cave after which he was Domestic Chaplain  to the Archbishop of York. Following incumbencies in Brayton and York he was Rector of Bolton Percy (1885–1923) and appointed Archdeacon of York in 1884. Five years later he became a suffragan bishop to assist within the Diocese of York and served to 1923. He was consecrated a bishop on 11 June 1889, by William Thomson, Archbishop of York, at York Minster. He became a Doctor of Divinity; and died on 9 September 1925 at Bolton Percy.

References

External links

1837 births
People from Wellington, Somerset
People educated at Leeds Grammar School
Fellows of Trinity College, Cambridge
1925 deaths
Archdeacons of York
19th-century Church of England bishops
20th-century Church of England bishops
Anglican suffragan bishops of Beverley